Finlay Macdonald or Finlay MacDonald may refer to:

Finlay Macdonald (minister) (born 1945), Moderator of the General Assembly of the Church of Scotland
Finlay MacDonald (musician) (born 1978), Scottish bagpiper
Finlay MacDonald (politician, born 1866) (died 1948), Canadian Member of Parliament for Cape Breton South, Nova Scotia
Finlay MacDonald (politician, born 1923) (died 2002), Canadian senator
Finlay Macdonald (editor) (born 1961) from New Zealand
Finlay MacDonald (Teenage Fanclub), Scottish rock musician
Finlay J. MacDonald (1925–1987), Scottish journalist and radio and television producer and writer